The Sanremo Music Festival 1959 was the ninth annual Sanremo Music Festival, held at the Sanremo Casino in Sanremo, province of Imperia between 30 January and 1 February 1959. The show was presented by  Enzo Tortora and Adriana Serra.
 
According to the rules of this edition every song  was performed in a double performance by a couple of singers or groups, with some artists performing multiple songs.
The winner of the Festival was "Piove (Ciao, ciao bambina)", performed by Domenico Modugno (who was also the composer of the song) and Johnny Dorelli. The couple had already won the previous edition of the festival with "Volare".

Participants and results

References 

Sanremo Music Festival by year
1959 in Italian music
1959 in music
1959 music festivals